This is a list of rural localities in Tuva. Tuva or  Tyva, officially the Tyva Republic (Tyva Respublika ), is a federal subject of Russia (a republic, also defined in the Constitution of the Russian Federation as a state). The Tuvan republic lies at the geographical center of Asia, in southern Siberia. The republic borders the Altai Republic, the Republic of Khakassia, Krasnoyarsk Krai, Irkutsk Oblast, and the Republic of Buryatia in Russia and Mongolia to the south. Its capital is the city of Kyzyl. It has a population of 307,930 (2010 census).

Locations 
 Bay-Khaak
 Chaa-Khol
 Erzin
 Khandagayty
 Khovu-Aksy
 Kungurtug
 Kyzyl-Mazhalyk
 Mugur-Aksy
 Samagaltay
 Saryg-Sep
 Sug-Aksy
 Teeli
 Toora-Khem
 Tos-Bulak

See also 

 
 Lists of rural localities in Russia

References 

Tuva